Liu Fei (December 29, 1905 – October 24, 1984) was a People's Liberation Army lieutenant general. He was born in Hong'an County, Hubei Province. He was a platoon and then company commander in the Chinese Workers' and Peasants' Red Army before being a regimental commander in the New Fourth Army.

References

1905 births
1984 deaths
People's Liberation Army generals from Hubei